Willis Reed Jr. (born June 25, 1942) is an American retired basketball player, coach and general manager. He spent his entire professional playing career (1964–1974) with the New York Knicks. In 1982, Reed was inducted into the Naismith Memorial Basketball Hall of Fame. In 1996, he was voted one of the "50 Greatest Players in NBA History". In October 2021, Reed was again honored as one of the league's greatest players of all-time by being named to the NBA 75th Anniversary Team.

After retiring as a player, Reed served as assistant and head coach with several teams for nearly a decade, then was promoted to general manager and vice president of basketball operations (1989–1996) for the New Jersey Nets. As senior vice president of basketball operations, he led them to the NBA Finals in 2002 and 2003.

Early life and education
Reed was born on June 25, 1942, in Dubach, Louisiana, within Lincoln Parish. He grew up on a farm in nearby Bernice, Louisiana. His parents worked to ensure Reed got an education in the segregated South. Reed showed athletic ability at an early age and played basketball at West Side High School in Lillie, Louisiana.

Reed attended Grambling State University, a historically black college. Playing for the Grambling State Tigers men's basketball team, Reed amassed 2,280 career points, averaging 26.6 points per game and 21.3 rebounds per game during his senior year. He led the Tigers to one NAIA title and three Southwestern Athletic Conference championships. Reed also became a member of Phi Beta Sigma fraternity.

Career
The New York Knicks selected Reed in the second round, with the eighth overall selection, in the 1964 NBA draft. Reed quickly made a name as a fierce, dominating and physical force on both ends of the floor. In March 1965, he scored 46 points against the Los Angeles Lakers, the second-highest single-game total ever by the Knicks' rookie. For the 1964–65 season, he ranked seventh in the NBA in scoring (19.5 points per game) and fifth in rebounding (14.7 rebounds per game). He also began his string of All-Star appearances and won the NBA Rookie of the Year Award while also being named to the NBA All-Rookie First Team.

Reed proved to be a clutch playoff performer throughout his career. He gave an early indication of this in the 1966–67 season when he improved his regular season averages to 20.9 points per game, and scoring 27.5 points per game in the postseason.

He played center. Despite his relatively average stature for a basketball player, he made up for his lack of height by playing a physical game, often ending seasons with respectable averages in blocking and rebounding.

The team continued to struggle for a few years while adding good players through trades and the draft. Dick McGuire was replaced as coach with Red Holzman, midway through the 1967–68 season. The Knicks had gone 15–22 under McGuire; Holzman steered them to a 28–17 finish. In 1968, New York's record was 43–39, its first winning record since the 1958–59 season.

Reed continued to make annual appearances in the NBA All-Star Game. By this time, he was playing power forward, to make room for Walt Bellamy. Reed averaged 11.6 rebounds in 1965–66 and 14.6 in 1966–67, both top 10 marks in the league. By the latter season, he had adjusted to the nuances of his new position, averaging 20.9 points to rank eighth in the NBA.

In 1968–69, New York held opponents to a league-low 105.2 points per game. With Reed clogging the middle and Walt Frazier pressuring the ball, the Knicks would be the best defensive club in the league for five of the next six seasons.

Reed scored 21.1 points per game in 1968–69 and grabbed a franchise-record 1,191 rebounds, an average of 14.5 rebounds per game.

First championship
In the 1969–70 season, the Knicks won a franchise-record 60 games and set a then single-season NBA record with an 18-game win streak. In 1970, Reed became the first player in NBA history to be named the NBA All-Star Game MVP, the NBA regular season MVP, and the NBA Finals MVP in the same season. That same year, he was named to the All-NBA First Team and NBA All-Defensive First Team, as well as being named as ABC's Wide World of Sports Athlete of the Year, and the Sporting News NBA MVP.

Reed's most famous performance took place on May 8, 1970, during game seven of the 1970 NBA Finals against the Los Angeles Lakers in Madison Square Garden. Due to a severe thigh injury, a torn muscle that had previously kept him out of game six, he was considered unlikely to play in game seven. However, Reed surprised the fans by walking onto the court during warmups, prompting widespread applause. Starting the game, he scored the Knicks' first two field goals on his first two shot attempts, his only points of the game. Following the game in the winner's locker room, a moved Howard Cosell told Reed on national television, "You exemplify the very best that the human spirit can offer."

Second championship
The Knicks slipped to a 52–30 record in the 1970–71 season, still good enough for first place in the Atlantic Division; and in mid-season, Reed tied Harry Gallatin's all-time club record by grabbing 33 rebounds against the Cincinnati Royals. Once again, Reed started in the All-Star Game. For the season, he averaged 20.9 points and 13.7 rebounds per game, but the Knicks were eliminated by the Baltimore Bullets in the Eastern Conference Finals. In 1971–72, Reed was bothered by tendinitis in his left knee, limiting his mobility. He missed two weeks early in the season and returned, but shortly thereafter the injured knee prohibited him from playing, and he totaled 11 games for the year. Without Reed, the Knicks still managed to make the NBA Finals, but were defeated in five games by the Los Angeles Lakers.

The 1972–73 Knicks finished the season with a 57–25 record and went on to win another NBA title. Reed was less of a contributor than he was two seasons earlier. In 69 regular season games, he averaged only 11.0 points. In the playoffs, the Knicks beat the Bullets and upset the Boston Celtics, and again faced the Lakers in the NBA Finals. After losing the first game, the Knicks captured four straight, claiming their second NBA championship with a 102–93 victory in game five, as Reed scored 18 points, grabbed 12 rebounds, and recorded 7 assists in the deciding victory. After the win, Reed was named NBA Finals MVP.

Reed's career was cut short by injuries, and he retired after the 1973–74 season. For his career, Reed averaged 18.7 points and 12.9 rebounds per game, playing 650 games. He played in seven All-Star Games.

Post-playing career
Reed spent several years coaching before moving into general management. He coached the Knicks in 1977–1978, and left the team 14 games into the following season (49–47 record). He was the head coach at Creighton University from 1981 to 1985 and volunteer assistant coach for St. John's University. Reed also served as an assistant coach for the NBA's Atlanta Hawks and Sacramento Kings.

Reed debuted as head coach of the New Jersey Nets on March 1, 1988, one week after the Nets' star forward (and Reed's cousin) Orlando Woolridge was suspended by the league and was to undergo drug rehabilitation. He compiled a 33–77 record with the Nets. In 1989, he was hired as the Nets' general manager and vice president of basketball operations (1989–1996). During this time, he drafted Derrick Coleman and Kenny Anderson, acquired Dražen Petrović, and made the Nets a playoff contender throughout the early 1990s. Reed hired Chuck Daly to coach the Nets for the 1992–93 and 1993–94 seasons. In 1996, Reed moved to the position of senior vice president of basketball operations, with the continued goal of building the Nets into a championship contender. The Nets made the NBA Finals in 2002 and 2003.

Reed next took the position of vice president of basketball operations with the New Orleans Hornets in 2004. He retired from that position in 2007.

Legacy
 In 1970, Reed was inducted into the NAIA Basketball Hall of Fame
 In 1982, Reed was enshrined in the Naismith Memorial Basketball Hall of Fame
 In 1997, Reed was elected to the NBA 50th Anniversary Team
 In 2021, Reed was elected to the NBA 75th Anniversary Team
 The March 16, 2022, game between Kent State and Southern Utah at The Basketball Classic was designated the Willis Reed Game.
 Starting with the 2021–22 NBA season, the NBA Southwest Division champion would receive the Willis Reed Trophy.

In popular media
Rap songs have mentioned Reed, recognizing his impressive athleticism and skill. Examples include Kurtis Blow's 1984 hit "Basketball" on his Ego Trip album, and the Beastie Boys' "Long Burn The Fire" on their 2011 album Hot Sauce Committee Part Two.

Reed's name has become synonymous with playing through injury, as Cris Collinsworth described an injured Aaron Rodgers as having a "Willis Reed kind of night" on the NBC Sunday Night Football broadcast on September 9, 2018.

NBA career statistics

Regular season

|-
| style="text-align:left;"|
| style="text-align:left;"|New York
| style="background:#cfecec;"|80* ||  || 38.0 || .432 ||  || .742 || 14.7 || 1.7 || — || — || 19.5
|-
| style="text-align:left;"|
| style="text-align:left;"|New York
| 76 ||  || 33.4 || .434 ||  || .757 || 11.6 || 1.2 ||  ||  || 15.5
|-
| style="text-align:left;"|
| style="text-align:left;"|New York
| 78 ||  || 36.2 || .489 ||  || .735 || 14.6 || 1.6 ||  ||  || 20.9
|-
| style="text-align:left;"|
| style="text-align:left;"|New York
| 81 ||  || 35.5 || .490 ||  || .721 || 13.2 || 2.0 ||  ||  || 20.8
|-
| style="text-align:left;"|
| style="text-align:left;"|New York
| 82 ||  || 37.9 || .521 ||  || .747 || 14.5 || 2.3 ||  ||  || 21.1
|-
| style="text-align:left; background:#afe6ba;"|
| style="text-align:left;"|New York
| 81 ||  || 38.1 || .507 ||  || .756 || 13.9 || 2.0 ||  ||  || 21.7
|-
| style="text-align:left;"|
| style="text-align:left;"|New York
| 73 ||  || 39.1 || .462 ||  || .785 || 13.7 || 2.0 ||  ||  || 20.9
|-
| style="text-align:left;"|
| style="text-align:left;"|New York
| 11 ||  || 33.0 || .438 ||  || .692 || 8.7 || 2.0 ||  ||  || 13.4
|-
| style="text-align:left; background:#afe6ba;"|
| style="text-align:left;"|New York
| 69 ||  || 27.2 || .474 ||  || .742 || 8.6 || 1.8 ||  ||  || 11.0
|-
| style="text-align:left;"|
| style="text-align:left;"|New York
| 19 ||  || 26.3 || .457 ||  || .792 || 7.4 || 1.6 || .6 || 1.1 || 11.1
|- class="sortbottom"
| style="text-align:center;" colspan="2"|Career
| 650 ||  || 35.5 || .476 ||  || .747 || 12.9 || 1.8 || .6 || 1.1 || 18.7
|- class="sortbottom"
| style="text-align:center;" colspan="2"|All-Star
| 7 || 4 || 23.0 || .452 ||  || .750 || 8.3 || 1.0 ||  ||  || 12.6

Playoffs

|-
| style="text-align:left;"|1967
| style="text-align:left;"|New York
| 4 ||  || 37.0 || .538 ||  || .960 || 13.8 || 1.8 ||  ||  || 27.5
|-
| style="text-align:left;"|1968
| style="text-align:left;"|New York
| 6 ||  || 35.0 || .541 ||  || .733 || 10.3 || 1.8 ||  ||  || 21.3
|-
| style="text-align:left;"|1969
| style="text-align:left;"|New York
| 10 ||  || 42.9 || .510 ||  || .786 || 14.1 || 1.9 ||  ||  || 25.7
|-
| style="text-align:left; background:#afe6ba;"|1970
| style="text-align:left;"|New York
| 18 ||  || 40.7 || .471 ||  || .737 || 13.8 || 2.8 ||  ||  || 23.7
|-
| style="text-align:left;"|1971
| style="text-align:left;"|New York
| 12 ||  || 42.0 || .413 ||  || .667 || 12.0 || 2.3 ||  ||  || 15.7
|-
| style="text-align:left;background:#afe6ba;"|1973
| style="text-align:left;"|New York
| 17 ||  || 28.6 || .466 ||  || .857 || 7.6 || 1.8 ||  ||  || 12.8
|-
| style="text-align:left;"|1974
| style="text-align:left;"|New York
| 11 ||  || 12.0 || .378 ||  || .600 || 2.0 || .4 || .2 || .0 || 3.4
|- class="sortbottom"
| style="text-align:center;" colspan="2"|Career
| 78 ||  || 33.9 || .474 ||  || .765 || 10.3 || 1.9 || .2 || .0 || 17.4

References
Footnotes

Bibliography

Further reading

External links

 Profile at Basketball Hall of Fame 
 Summary at NBA.com

1942 births
Living people
1963 FIBA World Championship players
20th-century African-American sportspeople
21st-century African-American people
African-American basketball coaches
African-American basketball players
African-American sports executives and administrators
American men's basketball players
American sports executives and administrators
Atlanta Hawks assistant coaches
Basketball coaches from Louisiana
Basketball players at the 1963 Pan American Games
Basketball players from Louisiana
Centers (basketball)
College men's basketball head coaches in the United States
Creighton Bluejays men's basketball coaches
Grambling State Tigers men's basketball players
Medalists at the 1963 Pan American Games
Naismith Memorial Basketball Hall of Fame inductees
National Basketball Association All-Stars
National Basketball Association players with retired numbers
National Collegiate Basketball Hall of Fame inductees
New Jersey Nets executives
New Jersey Nets head coaches
New Orleans Hornets executives
New York Knicks draft picks
New York Knicks head coaches
New York Knicks players
Pan American Games gold medalists for the United States
Pan American Games medalists in basketball
People from Dubach, Louisiana
People from Bernice, Louisiana
Power forwards (basketball)
Sacramento Kings assistant coaches
St. John's Red Storm men's basketball coaches
United States men's national basketball team players